Sandane Church is a parish church of the Church of Norway in Gloppen Municipality in Vestland county, Norway. It is located in the village of Sandane at the southern end of the Gloppefjorden. It is one of the four churches for the Gloppen parish which is part of the Nordfjord prosti (deanery) in the Diocese of Bjørgvin. The white, concrete church was built in a rectangular design in 1997 by the architect Helge Hjertholm. The church seats about 300 people.

History
Historically, the Sandane area was part of the parish of the medieval Vereide Church. By the 1930s, the people of Sandane began discussing building a new, more modern church. Some fundraising began, but the World War II came and went and it took a long time after the war before the parish began to really look at building a new church. In 1980s, the parish began seriously looking at this issue again. An architectural competition was won by the Bergen architect Helge Hjertholm. Construction began in the early 1990s. The first construction stage included building a church hall with some meeting rooms and a kitchen. This stage was completed in 1994. Soon after, construction on the main sanctuary began. The second stage was completed in 1997. The building was consecrated on 8 May 1997 by Bishop Ole Danbolt Hagesæther. For a while, the church was known as  since the church was located in the Mona neighborhood of Sandane. In 2016, the church became part of the newly established parish of Gloppen. In 2017, an office area was added on to the church building.

See also
List of churches in Bjørgvin

References

Gloppen
Churches in Vestland
Rectangular churches in Norway
Concrete churches in Norway
20th-century Church of Norway church buildings
Churches completed in 1997
1994 establishments in Norway